Fontenay-sous-Bois is a railway station on RER train network in Fontenay-sous-Bois, Val-de-Marne, France.

History 
Fontenay-sous-Bois station used to be served by the Bastille railway line (Paris Bastille – Marles-en-Brie), which ran from 1859 to 1969. It is now served by RER line A.

Transport

Train 
The station is served by a train every 10 minutes at off-peak time in both directions. That frequency is increased during peak hours, with up to 12 trains an hour, and falls to 1 train every 15 minutes at night.

Bus connections 
The station is served by  RATP Bus network lines:
 Line  from Val de Fontenay to Château de Vincennes ;
 Line  from Villiers-sur-Marne to Château de Vincennes ;
 Line , a shuttle service serving the different districts of Fontenay-sous-Bois.

Traffic 
The number of people entering the station in 2014 was 2,469,377.

References

Railway stations in France opened in 1969
Railway stations in Val-de-Marne
Réseau Express Régional stations